Adérìnókun is a Yoruba surname meaning "the crown or royalty walks on the ocean". Notable people with the surname include:

 David Olumide Aderinokun, Nigerian politician
 Ire Aderinokun, Nigerian software developer
 Tayo Aderinokun, Nigerian entrepreneur 

Yoruba-language surnames